Henrico County , officially the County of Henrico, is located in the Commonwealth of Virginia in the United States. As of the 2020 census, the population was 334,389 making it the fifth-most populous county in Virginia. Henrico County is included in the Greater Richmond Region. There is no incorporated community within Henrico County; therefore, there is no incorporated county seat either. Laurel, an unincorporated CDP, serves this function.

Named after the settlement of Henricus, Henrico was first incorporated as the City of Henrico.  In 1634, Henrico was reorganized as Henrico Shire, one of the eight original Shires of Virginia. It is one of the United States' oldest counties. The City of Richmond was officially part of Henrico County until 1842, when it became a fully independent city.

The present-day Henrico County curves around the City of Richmond, surrounding it to the west, the north, and the east. The county is bounded by the Chickahominy River to the north and the James River and Richmond to the south.

Richmond International Airport is located in the eastern portion of Henrico County in Sandston. Top private employers in the county include Capital One, Bon Secours Richmond Health System, and Anthem.

History
In 1611, Thomas Dale founded the Citie of Henricus on a peninsula in the James River that is now called Farrar's Island. Henricus was named for Henry Frederick, Prince of Wales, but it was destroyed during the Indian massacre of 1622, during which local Native American warriors of the Powhatan confederacy attacked the English settlers to drive them from the area.In 1634, Henrico Shire was one of the eight original Shires of Virginia established in the Virginia Colony. Since then, 10 counties and three independent cities have been formed from the original territory of Henrico Shire.

In 1776, Richard Adams and Nathaniel Wilkenson participated in the Fifth Virginia Convention, which voted to send delegates to the Continental Congress to propose separation from the British. That proposal led to the Declaration of Independence.During the Revolutionary War, when Benedict Arnold’s invading army occupied Richmond in January 1781, the Henrico militia was called to active duty. During the brief British occupation of Richmond, many Henrico court records were destroyed. Three months later when Arnold’s men, now part of British forces led by General William Phillips, approached Richmond for a second time, the British were stopped by the sight of local militiamen and American Continental troops led by a young Frenchman, the Marquis de Lafayette. Outnumbered, Lafayette abandoned Richmond when General Charles Cornwallis occupied the town in June 1781. Cornwallis then retired to Williamsburg and later to Yorktown. After being surrounded there by General George Washington and his French allies, Cornwallis surrendered, effectively ending the American Revolution.

Since becoming independent in 1842, the City of Richmond has successfully annexed portions of Henrico five times. Chesterfield County annexed the site of Henricus in 1922.

Henrico was badly hurt in the Civil War. During the Reconstruction era, Virginia Estelle Randolph was a pioneer educator and humanitarian who lived from 1874 to 1958. She opened the old Mountain Road School in 1892 and was named the first Jeanes Supervisor Industrial Teacher in Henrico County Schools in 1908. She conducted the first Arbor Day program in Virginia.

The USS Henrico was a Bayfield-class attack transport involved in World War Two and subsequent conflicts.

Richmond attempted to completely merge with Henrico in 1961, but 61% of the votes in a referendum in Henrico county voted against the merger. In 1965, Richmond attempted to annex 145 square miles of Henrico County. However, after a lengthy court battle, the city was given permission to annex only 17 square miles. Since the city would have had to reimburse Henrico a hefty $55 million, Richmond opted against annexing the 17 square miles.

In 1981, the Virginia General Assembly placed a moratorium on all annexations throughout the state. Henrico's borders have not changed since Richmond's 1942 annexation.

County seat
The original county seat was at Varina, at the Varina Farms plantation across the James River from Henricus. Colonist John Rolfe built this plantation, where he lived with his wife, Pocahontas. Henrico's government was located at Varina from around 1640 until 1752.

In 1752, Henrico relocated its seat to a more central location inside the city of Richmond, between Church Hill and what is now Tobacco Row. The county seat remained at 22nd and Main St in Richmond even after the city's government became fully independent of the county in 1842. It was not until 1974 when the county moved out of the Henrico County Courthouse to a complex in the western portion of the county at the intersection of Parham Road and Hungary Springs Road in Laurel.

In addition to the 1974 complex, in 1988 the county opened its Eastern Government Center to be more convenient to county residents in the eastern portion of the county. It is located on Nine Mile Road.

American Civil War battle sites
During the Civil War, in 1862 Henrico County was the site of numerous battles during the Peninsula Campaign, including:
 Battle of Seven Pines,
 Battle of Savage's Station,
 Battle of Oak Grove,
 Battle of Garnett's & Golding's Farm,
 Battle of White Oak Swamp,
 Battle of Glendale, and
 Battle of Malvern Hill.

Additional significant battles took place in 1864 during the Overland Campaign prior to and during the Siege of Petersburg, which led to the fall of Richmond. Confederate General J.E.B. Stuart was mortally wounded in Henrico County at the Battle of Yellow Tavern on May 12, 1864.

Transportation 
Henrico County is one of only two counties in Virginia that maintains its own roads, with the other being Arlington County. This special status was due to the existence of county highway departments prior to the creation in 1927 of the state agency that is now VDOT; and the assumption by that agency in 1932 of local roads in most counties. (Henrico and Arlington were grandfathered and allowed to continue pre-existing arrangements.) The control of the roads system is considered a powerful advantage for community urban planners, who can require developers to contribute to funding needed for road needs serving the planners' and developers' projects.

Henrico County is the site of Richmond International Airport. It hosts an Amtrak rail passenger station. It purchases public bus route services from Greater Richmond Transit Company, an FTA-funded public service company that is owned equally by the City of Richmond and neighboring Chesterfield County.

After Reconstruction, Henrico County used Convict lease to build roads in 1878.

Some old roads continue to be in use today, such as Horsepen Road, Three Chopt Road, and Quiocassin Road.

Major highways

Interstates

US Highways

State routes

Geography

Adjacent counties
 Charles City County (southeast)
 Chesterfield County (south)
 Goochland County (west)
 Hanover County (north)
 New Kent County (northeast)
 Richmond (south)
 Powhatan County (southwest at James River)

National protected area
 Richmond National Battlefield Park (part)

Climate
Henrico County is located within the humid subtropical climate zone and has hot and humid summers with moderately cold winters. Henrico County on average has 8 snow days. Henrico County has 88 days when the low falls below freezing, 50 days when the high exceeds 90 degrees, and 8 days when the high does not exceed freezing.

Source: Climate-data.org

Demographics

2020 census

Note: the US Census treats Hispanic/Latino as an ethnic category. This table excludes Latinos from the racial categories and assigns them to a separate category. Hispanics/Latinos can be of any race.

2010 Census
As of the census of 2010, there were 306,935 people, 127,111 households, and 69,846 families residing in the county. The population density was 1,252 people per square mile (487/km2). As of 2019, there were 139,274 housing units at an average density of 568 per square mile (183/km2). In 2018, the racial makeup of the county was 57% (185,772) White, 29.5% (96,112) Black or African American, 0.2% (728) Native American, 8.2% (26,557) Asian, 0.03% (95) Pacific Islander, 0.98% (3,106) from other races, and 3.1% (10,232) from two or more races. About 5.5% (17,959) of the population was Hispanic or Latino of any race.

The largest ancestry groups in Henrico County are: Black or African American (25%), English American (14%), German (11%), Irish (10%) and Italian (4%)

In 2000, there were 108,121 households, out of which 31.90% had children under the age of 18 living with them, 48.30% were married couples living together, 13.10% had a female householder with no husband present, and 35.40% were non-families. 28.90% of all households were made up of individuals, and 8.50% had someone living alone who was 65 years of age or older. The average household size was 2.39 and the average family size was 2.97.

In the county, the population was spread out, with 25.1% under the age of 19, 7.80% from 20 to 24, 27.7% from 25 to 44, 25.9% from 45 to 64, and 14.60% who were 65 years of age or older. The median age was 38.5 years. For every 100 females there were 90.11 males. For every 100 females age 18 and over, there were 83.60 males.

In 2019, the median income for a household in the county was $68,024, and the median income for a family was $91,956. The per capita income for the county was $40,222. 9% of the population were below the poverty line.

Government and politics 

Henrico County is managed by an appointed county manager who answers directly to the Board of Supervisors. The current county manager is John A. Vithoulkas. 

The Board of Supervisors are:
 Brookland District – Dan Schmitt (R)
 Fairfield District – Frank J. Thornton (D)
 Three Chopt District – Thomas M. Branin (R)
 Tuckahoe District – Patricia S. O'Bannon (R)
 Varina District – Tyrone E. Nelson (D)

In 2014, Henrico County won 'Best in Government' from Richmond Magazine.

There are several elected constitutional officers.
 Clerk of the Circuit Court – Heidi S. Barshinger (R)
 Commonwealth's Attorney – Shannon Taylor (D)
 Sheriff – Alisa Gregory (D)

There are also several legislative representatives.

In the U.S. House of Representatives:
 Democrat Abigail Spanberger
 Democrat Jennifer McClellan

In the Virginia Senate:
 Democrat Jennifer L. McClellan
 Republican Siobhan Dunnavant

In the Virginia House of Delegates:
 Republican John McGuire
 Republican Riley E. Ingram
 Democrat Dawn M. Adams
 Democrat Dolores L. McQuinn
 Democrat Jeffrey M. Bourne
 Democrat Schuyler T. VanValkenburg
 Democrat Rodney Willett
 Democrat Lamont Bagby

National politics

From the 1950s until the 2000s, Henrico County was solidly Republican in presidential elections, and was considered a classic bastion of suburban conservatism. However, Barack Obama won the county in 2008, becoming the first Democrat to do so since Harry Truman in 1948, and it has voted for the Democratic nominee in every subsequent presidential election. Mirroring the shift towards Democrats seen in many affluent suburban counties across the country, Joe Biden won Henrico County by nearly 30 points in 2020.

Law enforcement

The Henrico County Sheriff's Office and Henrico County Police are Henrico County's county-level law enforcement agencies. Thomas Dale led the county militia and was the first law enforcement officer in the county: the Sheriff's department considers him the first Sheriff of Henrico County. The county police were founded in 1915. In 1938, the board of supervisors put the police under the direct control of the county manager, rather than under the Sheriff.

The elected Sheriff's primary duties are managing the jail, court security, and the service of civil process. In 1880, the first courthouse and jail was constructed and housed the Sheriff's Office and Jail until 1980. In 1980, in the need for a more technological advanced and more spacious area, the Jail West at the Henrico County Government Complex was constructed. In 1996, Henrico's Sheriff's Office opened Jail East in New Kent County.

The Henrico County Police Division is fully accredited by the Commission for Accreditation of Law Enforcement Agencies and Virginia Law Enforcement Professional Standards Commission.

Fire and EMS 
The Division of Fire is responsible for fire suppression, emergency medical services, hazardous materials response, technical rescue, water rescue, fire prevention, fire investigation, public education, disaster preparedness and emergency management. The Henrico County Fire Department includes 548 members, of whom 526 are sworn firefighters. The division operates 68 fire apparatus at 20 community fire stations. The division is rated ISO class 1.

Additionally, the department encompasses several specialized units, including a Water Rescue Team, Technical Rescue Team, Hazardous Incident Team, and special events resources. In 2014, the Division of Fire responded to 41,759 emergency incidents.

Economy

Altria Group (formerly Philip Morris) had its corporate headquarters in an unincorporated area in Henrico County. In 2003 Philip Morris announced that it would move its headquarters from New York City to Virginia. The company said that it planned to keep around 750 employees in its former headquarters. Brendan McCormick, a spokesperson for Philip Morris, said that the company estimated that the move would save the company over $60 million each year. This relocation was made with the help of the Henrico County Economic Development Authority and the Greater Richmond Partnership, regional economic development organizations who also helped locate Aditya Birla Minacs, Alfa Laval, Genworth Financial, and Blue Bell Ice Cream to the county.

Top employers
According to the County's 2014 Comprehensive Annual Financial Report, the top employers in the county are:

Cost of living
March 2012 cost of living index in Henrico County: 86.5 (less than average, U.S. average is 100)

Education

The school division known as Henrico County Public Schools consists of 45 elementary schools, 13 middle schools, 10 high schools and two technical centers within one school division. In 2001, HCPS began distributing Apple iBooks to every high school student. In 2003, they extended the program to middle schools. In 2005, the HCPS School Board decided to replace the iBooks with Dell's Inspiron 600M at the high school level. In 2006, the HCPS School Board decided to continue using Apple iBooks at the middle school level, purchasing nearly 13,000 laptops in a contract worth $15.8 million. In 2010, HCPS School Board opened a new middle school, Holman Middle School, and opened a new high school, Glen Allen High School.

Communities

There are no existing incorporated towns, and no new municipalities can be created within the county. Henrico was the third Virginia county (after Arlington and Fairfax counties) to be affected by a state law that prohibits the creation of any new towns or cities within the boundaries of a county with a population density of 1,000 or more per square mile.

Census-designated places

 Chamberlayne
 Dumbarton
 East Highland Park
 Glen Allen
 Highland Springs
 Innsbrook
 Lakeside
 Laurel
 Montrose
 Sandston
 Short Pump
 Tuckahoe
 Wyndham

Other communities
 Fair Oaks
 Varina

Former towns
Prior to 1870, the Town and later City of Richmond was located within Henrico County. Under a new Virginia state constitution in 1870, and as further clarified by rewritten one in 1902, Richmond became an independent city.

At the end of the 19th century and in the early 20th century, several small incorporated towns were chartered by Acts of Assembly, primarily in areas of the county near to, but outside of, the city limits. As listed by the Secretary of the Commonwealth, these included:
 Barton Heights, incorporated 1896, annexed by the City of Richmond in 1914
 Fairmount, incorporated 1902, annexed by the City of Richmond in 1914
 Ginter Park, annexed by the City of Richmond
 Highland Park, annexed by the City of Richmond in 1914
 North Richmond, annexed by the City of Richmond

Notable people
 Van T. Barfoot, Medal of Honor recipient
 Gabriel Prosser, Revolutionary
 Constance Wu, actress
 Debbie Matenopoulos, television personality
 Daniel Lynch (baseball), baseball player
 TV Man

Trivia

For many years, the United States Postal Service considered most of Henrico County to be unincorporated Richmond, and the majority of locations in the county had a Richmond address. However, in 2008 county residents won the right to recognize Henrico County as the locality to which they pay the majority of their taxes. As of October 1, 2008, the primary mailing address for the majority of the county was officially changed to Henrico. It was estimated that the county would recover $5 million in misdirected tax dollars due to the address change. This move has set a precedent causing many other localities in Virginia who are officially recognized by the United States Postal Service as the nearest major city to consider petitioning the United States Postal Service for their own official mailing address bearing the name of the locality to which residents actually pay their taxes.

Henrico County is the location of Richmond Raceway, which is home to Monster Energy NASCAR Cup Series races twice a year.

Henrico County is the county that handles hazardous material spills and related problems (with three HAZMAT Teams) for the entire Central Virginia Region. Partly because of this, Central Virginia has total interoperability of Emergency Communications (Police, Fire, Recreation and Parks, Volunteer Rescue Squads, etc.) between the cities and more than ten counties.

Henrico County has the highest bond rating (Triple, triple-A) from the three bond rating agencies in the United States, which means Henrico is known nationwide for its solid fiscal responsibility.

Henrico County residents are served by the Henrico Area Mental Health and Developmental Services, which has a CARF three-year accreditation. All fees for services rendered are based on financial need, providing mental health and recovery support services to thousands who otherwise would not be able to afford this due to their own limited financial resources. Nobody is denied service due to an inability to pay.

See also
 Henrico Citizen
 Henrico County Fire Department
 Henrico County Police Department
 Henrico County Public Schools
 National Register of Historic Places listings in Henrico County, Virginia
 Henrico County Sheriff's Office (Virginia)
 Henrico County Public Library

References

External links
 
 Henrico County Historical Society
 

 
1634 establishments in Virginia
Virginia counties
Counties on the James River (Virginia)
Virginia shires
Geography of Richmond, Virginia
Populated places established in 1634
Majority-minority counties and independent cities in Virginia